Major-General Sir James Lauderdale Gilbert Burnett, 13th Baronet,  (1 April 1880 – 13 August 1953) was a British Army officer.

Military career
Born the son of Colonel Sir Thomas Burnett, 12th Baronet and Mary Elizabeth Cumine and educated at Wellington College, Burnett was commissioned into the Gordon Highlanders on 6 December 1899. He was appointed a Companion of the Distinguished Service Order in March 1915 and subsequently commanded the 1st Battalion, the Gordon Highlanders and then a brigade during the First World War.

He went on to be commander of 14th Infantry Brigade in January 1927, commander of 153rd Infantry Brigade in January 1928 and commander of 8th Infantry Brigade in March 1930. His last appointment was as General Officer Commanding 51st (Highland) Division in June 1931 before retiring in June 1935.

He was colonel of the Gordon Highlanders from 1939 to 1948.

He gave Crathes Castle, which had served as the ancestral seat of the Burnetts of Leys, to the National Trust for Scotland in 1951.

Family
In 1913, he married Sybil Crozier Smith; they had two sons and a daughter, Rohays, who was the mother of the racehorse trainer Sir Henry Cecil.

References

|-

1880 births
1953 deaths
British Army generals of World War I
Companions of the Order of the Bath
Companions of the Order of St Michael and St George
Companions of the Distinguished Service Order
Gordon Highlanders officers
British Army major generals
People educated at Wellington College, Berkshire
Baronets in the Baronetage of Nova Scotia